The first ever Los Angeles Daily News was a print publication by Los Angeles-based King & Offutt company.  

The newspaper began publishing in 1869 and continuing for a number of years after. Volume 1, No. 1 was on January 1, 1869. The last publication date is not known.

See also
Los Angeles Daily News (1923-1954) founded in 1923 as Illustrated Daily News
Los Angeles Daily News, published currently starting 1911 as the Van Nuys Call

References

Publications established in 1869
1869 establishments in California